Jan Joosten (born 17 May 1959) is a Belgian biblical scholar and convicted sex offender. From 2014 to 2020, he was Regius Professor of Hebrew at the University of Oxford; he was previously Professor of the Old Testament at the University of Strasbourg. In June 2020, he was found guilty of possessing child pornography, and was dismissed from his Chair at Oxford.

Career
Joosten completed his studies in 1981 in Brussels. His areas of interest are the Septuagint, Syriac versions of the Bible, a biblical manuscript found at Qumran, and the Diatessaron. He was a pastor for six years in Belgium. He was, until June 2020, also a member of the Society of Biblical Literature. He is considered one of the most distinguished biblical scholars of his generation. As of Friday 3 July 2020, Joosten was no longer employed by Oxford University nor was he a trustee of Christ Church College, and he was no longer affiliated in any way with the institution.

Joosten was president of the International Organization for Septuagint and Cognate Studies.

Child pornography conviction
On 18 June 2020, Joosten was sentenced by the Saverne (he lives in the Bas-Rhin region) criminal court to one year in prison and placed on the sex offender registry in France for holding 27,000 images and one thousand videos of child pornography, including images of children being raped. Joosten admitted to offences dating from 2014 to May 2020 after being exposed by Strasbourg LION (laboratoire d’investigation opérationnelle du numérique) as part of a lengthy investigation. Joosten downloaded the images over a six-year period. He was 'relieved to be arrested'. He described his addiction to pornographic images and videos of children as a "secret garden" that contradicted who he is as a person.

On his conviction, he was not immediately incarcerated. His sentence would be supervised, and he would have to complete a three-year programme of treatment. He was prohibited from any activity bringing him into contact with minors. Joosten has four children.

Rémi Gounelle, the Dean of the Faculté de théologie protestante de Strasbourg, released this statement following Joosten's arrest:

Gounelle argued that, whilst the unmasking of Joosten as a paedophile was deeply shocking, it does not call into question his pedagogical and scientific skills. Joosten still holds a role at the University of Strasbourg. 

In a public statement that noted his "shocking crimes and... the suffering endured by those in the images he accessed,"  Oxford University announced Joosten's removal from employment.

Works 
 "The Syriac Language of the Peshitta and Old Syriac Versions of Matthew. Syntactic Structure, Inner-Syriac Developments and Translation Technique", Studies in Semitic Languages and Linguistics 22 (Leiden, Brill, 1996)
 "People and Land in the Holiness Code. An Exegetical Study of the Ideational Framework of the Law in Leviticus 17–26", Supplements to Vetus Testamentum 67 (Leiden, Brill, 1996)
 "Édition (avec Ph. Le Moigne) des actes du colloque Aspects de la Bible grecque", dans la Revue des Sciences Religieuses 280 (1999), pp. 132–228.
 En collaboration avec Eberhard Bons et Stephan Kessler, Les Douze Prophètes. Osée, La Bible d'Alexandrie 23, 1 (Paris, Cerf, 2002).
 "The Dura Parchment and the Diatessaron", Vigiliae Christianae, 57, (2003), 159–175.
 "En collaboration avec Philippe Le Moigne, L'apport de la Septante aux études sur l'Antiquité". Actes du colloque de Strasbourg 8 et 9 novembre 2002, Lectio Divina 203 (Paris, Cerf, 2005).

See also 
 Dura Parchment 24

References

External links 
 Jan Joosten at the University of Strasbourg
 Publications of Jan Joosten
 Joosten Sentenced by Criminal Court

1959 births
Living people
21st-century Christian biblical scholars
Belgian biblical scholars
Regius Professors of Hebrew (University of Oxford)
Belgian Protestants
People from Ekeren
People convicted of child pornography offenses